Edmund William Wright (4 April 1824 – 5 August 1888) was a London-born Australian architect, engineer and businessman who was Mayor of Adelaide in 1859.

Early life
Wright was the third son of Stephen Amand Wright who may have been Master of Ordnance at the Tower of London. He trained as architect and surveyor and in 1849 emigrated with his brother Edward to South Australia, where they worked as land agents and joined the rush to the Victorian goldfields, but by 1852 he had returned to Adelaide where he married Agnes Jane Stuckey (née Rippingville). Agnes was the widow of Henry Stuckey (c. 1820 – 31 May 1851), also an Adelaide architect.

Business career
He worked as insurance agent and was appointed to the boards of several mining companies. In 1859 he was elected Mayor of the City of Adelaide. In 1875, he succeeded Alfred Watts as Consul for Sweden and Norway.

Architect

Wright was a partner with E. J. Woods and E. A. Hamilton in the architectural firm of Wright, Woods & Hamilton, later Wright and Hamilton, from 1866 to 1871 and from 1888 to 1893 with James Henry Reed and Isidor Beaver as Wright, Reed & Beaver. He designed (either alone or in partnership) the following buildings:
"Belmont", Brougham Place, North Adelaide (1858)
Bank of South Australia, Commercial Rd, Port Adelaide (1859)
Congregational Church, Brougham Place, North Adelaide (1861)
Methodist Meeting Hall, off Pirie Street, Adelaide (1863)
St Rose of Lima Catholic Church, Kapunda (1866), rebuilt in 1938 to designs by Herbert Jory.
St. Laurence's Church and Priory, Buxton Street, North Adelaide (1867–1868)
GPO (General Post Office) building, King William Street, Adelaide (1867–1872)
Jewish Synagogue, off Rundle Street East (1871)
Bank of South Australia, now "Edmund Wright House" 59 King William Street, with Lloyd Tayler (1878)
Royal Exchange, King William Street, for John Robb
Bank of Adelaide, 81 King William Street, Adelaide (1878–1880)
West wing of Parliament House, North Terrace, Adelaide (1883–1889)
"Linden" at Burnside
"Paringa Hall" for the Cudmore family, Brighton Road, Brighton
"Athelney" at College Park
"Princess Royal" homestead at Burra
Adelaide Educational Institution schoolhouse, 61–71 Young Street, Parkside
National Mutual Life building (later Goode House and Bank of New Zealand), 389-399 Collins Street, Melbourne (1887-1893)

References

External links
P. A. Howell, Wright, Edmund William (1824-1888), Australian Dictionary of Biography, Supplementary Volume, Melbourne University Press, 2005, pp 414–415.
Sullivan, Christine, 'Wright, Edmund William', Architects of South Australia, Architecture Museum, University of South Australia, 2008.

1824 births
1888 deaths
English emigrants to colonial Australia
Mayors and Lord Mayors of Adelaide
Architects from London
19th-century Australian architects
19th-century Australian politicians
Burials at North Road Cemetery